Kyrylo Vladyslavovych Yanitskyi (born 12 November 2003) is a Ukrainian professional footballer who plays as a central midfielder for Hungarian club Csákvár on loan from Puskás Akadémia.

Career

Puskás Akadémia II
He is a product of Puskás Akadémia II in Hungary.

Puskás Akadémia
Kyrylo Yanitskyi started his career with Puskás Akadémia in Nemzeti Bajnokság I. On 11 November 2021 he made his debut against Gyirmót in the season 2021-22 at the Pancho Aréna in Felcsút replacing Yoell van Nieff at the 82nd minute.

Career statistics

Club

References

External links
 
 

2003 births
Living people
Ukrainian footballers
Association football midfielders
Puskás Akadémia FC players
Puskás Akadémia FC II players
Csákvári TK players
Nemzeti Bajnokság I players
Nemzeti Bajnokság II players
Nemzeti Bajnokság III players
Ukrainian expatriate footballers
Expatriate footballers in Hungary
Ukrainian expatriate sportspeople in Hungary